Distigmine (as distigmine bromide) is a parasympathomimetic. Distigmine is similar to pyridostigmine and neostigmine but has a longer duration of action. It is available as tablets on prescription only. It is commonly used to treat various conditions, including myasthenia gravis and underactive bladder. Distigmine has a greater risk of causing cholinergic crisis because of accumulation of the drug being more likely than with neostigmine or pyridostigmine and so distigmine is rarely used as a treatment for myasthenia gravis, unlike pyridostigmine and neostigmine.

References 

Acetylcholinesterase inhibitors
Biscarbamates
Pyridinium compounds
Bisquaternary anticholinesterases
Aromatic carbamates